Syzygium johnsonii, known as the rose satinash, is a rainforest tree of tropical and subtropical Queensland, Australia.

References

johnsonii
Myrtales of Australia
Flora of Queensland
Trees of Australia